Seven Mile Island is an island located inside western Coronation Gulf, south of Victoria Island, in the Kitikmeot Region, Nunavut, Canada.

Other islands in the vicinity include Blaze Island, Kigirktaryuk Island, Onitkok Island, and the Berens Islands, Couper Islands, Deadman Islands, Nichols Islands, and Sir Graham Moore Islands. The community of Kugkluktuk (formerly Coppermine) is located on the mainland,  to the southwest.

References

 Seven Mile Island at the Atlas of Canada

Islands of Coronation Gulf
Uninhabited islands of Kitikmeot Region